The 1971–72 Primeira Divisão was the 38th season of top-tier football in Portugal.

Overview
It was contested by 16 teams, and S.L. Benfica won the championship.

League standings

Results

Season statistics

Top goalscorers

References

External links
 Portugal 1971-72 - RSSSF (Jorge Miguel Teixeira)
 Portuguese League 1971/72 - footballzz.co.uk
 Portugal - Table of Honor - Soccer Library

Primeira Liga seasons
1971–72 in Portuguese football
Portugal